Lü Chenwei (also spelled Lyu, born 16 January 1991) is a Chinese former professional snooker player.

Career
Lü appeared in the 2010 China Open as a wildcard aged 19, but lost 5–2 to Robert Milkins. When the Asian Players Tour Championship events were introduced in 2012, it gave Lü an opportunity to qualify for the professional snooker tour. It was in 2013/2014 events where Lü started to make an impact and he reached semi-finals of the 2013 Zhangjiagang Open, where he lost out to eventual winner Ju Reti 4–2. This result was the main factor in Lü gaining a tour year place on the professional World Snooker Tour for the 2014–15 and 2015–16 seasons.

Debut season
Lü won a match as a professional at the first attempt by beating Dominic Dale 5–2 to qualify for the 2014 Wuxi Classic, where he lost 5–2 to Jack Lisowski. He could not win another match in a qualifying event during the rest of the season. He played in his first UK Championship as all tour players start at the venue stage of this event, but was defeated 6–1 by Ryan Day in the first round. Lü was the world number 113 after his first season on tour.

2015/2016 season
Lü won one match all season which came at a minor-ranking European Tour event. He did come very close to beating two-time world champion Mark Williams in the opening round of the Welsh Open by levelling at 3–3 from 3–1 down, but could not take advantage of numerous chances that came his way in the decider. He played in Q School to earn a place back on tour and lost twice in the fourth round. Whilst this was not enough it did give him entry to some events as a top-up player due to his Q School Order of Merit ranking.

2016/2017 season
He qualified for the Paul Hunter Classic and was whitewashed 4–0 by Thepchaiya Un-Nooh in the opening round. Lü entered Q School but did not get beyond the third round of either event.

Performance and rankings timeline

References

External links
 
 
 Lyu Chenwei at ProSnooker Blog.com

1991 births
Place of birth unknown
Living people
Chinese snooker players
21st-century Chinese people